The Podlastva Monastery is a medieval women's Serbian Orthodox monastery located in Lastva Grbaljska, in Grbalj, Montenegro. The monastery's church is dedicated to the 
Birth of the Most Holy Theotokos.

According to a local legend, the Podlastva Monastery was established around 1350 by Emperor Dušan.  It has been pillaged, burned, destroyed, and renovated several times over its history.  Montenegro's 1979 earthquake caused a great deal of damage that was partly rehabilitated in 1984.

Podlastva Monastery has long served as a common gathering place for all Grbljani (people).  Many important spiritual, cultural, and political events during this region's turbulent history occurred on the monastery grounds.  It also provided educational enrichment during the years in which it had operated a local school.

Etymology 

The popular name of the monastery is derived from its location downhill or "below" (pod) the local village of Lastva.

The Church 
The church was constructed of stone masonry under a tiled roof.  Its front exterior includes a bell tower attached to an independent narthex.  The narthex is structurally attached to both the nave and an adjacent monastery building.  An apse is located at the nave's east end.

Both narthex and nave have barrel vaulted ceilings.  The nave's ceiling walls are covered with rare, historic frescos dating from the 15th and 17th centuries.  Its contemporary iconostasis includes modern icons.

See also
List of Serbian Orthodox monasteries
Grbalj

References

Further reading 
 

Medieval Serbian Orthodox monasteries
Medieval Montenegro
Medieval Serbia
Nemanjić dynasty endowments
14th-century Serbian Orthodox church buildings
Christian monasteries established in the 14th century
Serbian Orthodox monasteries in Montenegro
Rebuilt buildings and structures in Montenegro
Budva Municipality